Kuangqu was a district of Datong, Shanxi province, China. The district is made up of 28 subdistricts.

References

External links
www.xzqh.org 

County-level divisions of Shanxi
Datong
Populated places established in 1970
Populated places disestablished in 2018